B. Babusivan (4 November 1964 - 16 September 2020) was an Indian film director and screenwriter of Tamil films. He initially began his career as an assistant director to film director Dharani. In 2009, Babusivan became independent director in Vettaikaaran starring Vijay, Anushka Shetty and Srihari .

After a long interval in 2019, B. Babusivan made his re-entry in Tamil serials taking over Rasaathi, a Sun TV serial.

Babusivan died on September 16, 2020.

Filmography
Films

Serials

References

1964 births
2020 deaths
Film directors from Chennai
Tamil film directors
Tamil screenwriters
21st-century Indian film directors
Screenwriters from Chennai